Gopala Ramanujam (1915–2001) was an Indian politician and co-founder of the Indian National Trade Union Congress. He was born on 28 May 1915 at Edircottal village, Ramanathapuram District in Tamil Nadu, India. He was a recipient of the third highest Indian civilian award of the Padma Bhushan.

Trade Union
He was trained in trade union work during 1945 to 1947 at the Hindusthan Mazdoor Sevak Sangh and Majur Mahajan,
Ahmedabad, an institution founded by Mahatma Gandhi. He was the president of the INTUC from 1958 to 1960, and general secretary from 1964 till 1984. In 1985, he was again elected president, and held the post until 3 August 1994.

To honour his commitment to trade unionism, the Chennai-based National Centre for Industrial Harmony conducts the annual G. Ramanujam Memorial Lecture. There is also a permanent chair in his name at The Tamil Nadu Institute of Labour Studies.

Governor
He was Governor of Goa from 4 August 1994, to 15 June 1995, before being transferred to Odisha. He was sworn in as Governor of Odisha on 18 June 1995, and stepped down on 30 January 1997. He did another stint from 13 February 1997, to 13 December 1997.

He held additional charge of Andhra Pradesh, from 22 August to 23 November 1997, when incumbent Krishan Kant was elected vice-president.

See also
 List of Governors of Odisha
 List of Governors of Goa

References

Governors of Goa
Governors of Odisha
1915 births
2001 deaths
Recipients of the Padma Bhushan in social work
Trade unionists from Tamil Nadu
People from Ramanathapuram district
20th-century Indian educational theorists
Scholars from Tamil Nadu
Tamil Nadu politicians